Una is a genus of butterflies in the family Lycaenidae found in southeast Asia. It contains at least the species Una usta (Distant, 1886), and possibly a second species called Una philippensis Schröder & Treadaway, 1986, which is endemic to the Philippines and viewed by some authors as a subspecies of U. usta.

External links

 
 
 Images representing Una  at Bold

Polyommatini
Lycaenidae genera